Divya Seth Shah is an Indian film and television actress, who started her career with TV serial Hum Log, playing Majhli. She is the daughter of actress Sushma Seth and Dhruv Seth.

She has done theatre with Barry John in Delhi, television shows and films like Jab We Met.

Career
Divya Seth was seen in the latest web series, The Married Woman, directed by Sahir Raza. The star cast also includes Ridhi Dogra, Monica Dogra.

Television

Films

Web series

References

External link
 

Indian television actresses